Samuel Robail (born 2 June 1985) is a French professional footballer who plays as a midfielder for Iris Club de Croix.

Career
Robail has spent time on loan with US Boulogne, he came from Lille OSC.

Personal life
He is the twin brother of Mathieu Robail.

References

External links
 
 

1985 births
Living people
Association football midfielders
French footballers
Lille OSC players
US Boulogne players
R.F.C. Seraing (1922) players
Ligue 1 players
Iris Club de Croix players
People from Cambrai
Sportspeople from Nord (French department)
French twins
Twin sportspeople
Footballers from Hauts-de-France
French expatriate footballers
French expatriate sportspeople in Belgium
Expatriate footballers in Belgium